A Tale of Two Cities: The Circuit City Story is a documentary produced, directed, and edited by Tom Wulf. The documentary chronicles the entire 60-year history of the Richmond-based retailer, Circuit City. The documentary traces the defunct retailer from its humble beginnings as the family-owned Wards TV, to its rise to become the nation's largest specialty retailer of consumer electronics, to its downhill slide into bankruptcy and liquidation in 2009.

According to its website, the film "tells the tale of two "Cities:" one that went from good to great, and the other that went from great to gone."

The film made its world premiere at the Virginia Film Festival in November 2010.

References

External links 
 
 
 Story from Richmondbizsense website
 Virginia Film Festival
 WTVR Story
 RVA News Story

2010 films
Documentary films about business
2010s English-language films